The Richland–West End Historic District is a historic district on the Western side of Nashville, Tennessee.  It comprises approximately a 12-block area consisting mostly of Bungalow/craftsman architecture and about 70 Foursquare-style houses.

History
In the Antebellum Era, the district was a plantation owned by John Brown Craighead, the son of Presbyterian minister Thomas B. Craighead.  John Brown Craighead's wife, Jane Erwin Dickinson, was the widow of a man killed in an 1806 duel with future U.S. president Andrew Jackson.  The plantation remained in the Craighead family until the end of the American Civil War. By 1905, the Richland Realty Company developed the area, by laying out streets and building bungalows.

The district has been listed on the National Register of Historic Places since April 16, 1979.

The original Craighead House has award-winning gardens and architecture.

See also
National Register of Historic Places listings in Davidson County, Tennessee

References

Historic districts on the National Register of Historic Places in Tennessee
Neighborhoods in Nashville, Tennessee
National Register of Historic Places in Nashville, Tennessee
American Foursquare architecture